The 1935–36 Divizia B was the second season of the second tier of the Romanian football league system.

The champions of each of the five series qualified to a play-off round. The winner of this play-off played against the last placed team in the 1935–36 Divizia A.

ILSA Timișoara won the play-off, but they lost the promotion to Universitatea Cluj.

Team changes 

CA Arad, Ceramica Bistriţa, Vitrometan Mediaş and Unirea CFR Paşcani were replaced by Craiovan Craiova, Victoria Carei, IAR Brașov and Dragoș Vodă Cernăuți.

League standings

Seria I

Seria II

Seria III

Seria IV

Seria V

League play-off

Promotion / relegation play-off

See also 
 1935–36 Divizia A

References

Liga II seasons
Romania
2